Saptham is a 2002 Indian Tamil-language film directed by Sivaguru and starring Rishi, Rithiga, Sriman and Abhinayashree. It was released on 15 March 2002.

Cast
Rishi as Arun
Rithiga as Vaidehi
Sriman as Pradeep
Abhinayashree as Jennifer
Charle as Kothandam
Ramesh Khanna as Jagir

Reception
The film was released on 15 March 2002. In his review, S. R. Ashok Kumar of The Hindu noted "if only the director Sivaguru, who is also in charge of story, screenplay and dialogue had paid more attention to the narration, he could have come up with an enjoyable film." Malini Mannath of ChennaiOnline wrote "in a futile effort to take the audience by surprise, the director who begins it as a love story, suddenly turns it into a triangle, only to reveal in the end that there were four players in the game".

References

External links

2002 films
2002 drama films
Indian drama films
2000s Tamil-language films